Warden Bridge is a road bridge across the River South Tyne near Warden.

History
The first road bridge at Warden was a suspension bridge built in 1826. It was replaced by a stone arch bridge in 1903.

References

Bridges in Northumberland
Crossings of the River Tyne